Mallory Leigh Eubanks (born June 4, 1996) is an American soccer forward who played for the Washington Spirit in the National Women's Soccer League (NWSL).

Playing career

College

Mississippi State
In 2014, Eubanks attended Mississippi State University, where she played for the Mississippi State Bulldogs. Impressing her freshman year, Eubanks was named to the SEC All-Freshman team. She would go on to earn additional honors including 2017 SEC Scholar-Athlete of the Year and Second Team All-SEC. Her college career saw her earn 70 appearances for the Bulldogs, scoring 8 goals and registering 17 assists.

Club

Washington Spirit
In January 2018, Eubanks was drafted by the Washington Spirit in the second round, sixteenth overall. However, due to roster limits, she was waived before the season started with her rights retained by the Spirit. By Week 2 of the season, Eubanks was signed as a Replacement Player for Argentine player, Estefanía Banini. While playing as replacement status, teammate Cali Farquharson was placed on the disable list due to injury, opening a full roster spot. Eubanks signed a full contract with the Spirit on May 17 and played out the rest of the season making 12 appearances for the Spirit.

References

External links
 Washington Spirit player profile
 

1996 births
Living people
American women's soccer players
Mississippi State Bulldogs women's soccer players
National Women's Soccer League players
Soccer players from Kentucky
Sportspeople from Lexington, Kentucky
Washington Spirit draft picks
Washington Spirit players
Women's association football forwards